Melone (Chieti)  is a frazione in the Province of Chieti in the Abruzzo region of Italy.

Frazioni of the Province of Chieti